Charles Henry Wilson may refer to:

 Charles Wilson, 1st Baron Nunburnholme (1833–1907), English shipowner
 Charles Wilson (Conservative politician) (1859–1930), British politician
Charles Wilson (historian) (1914–1991), English business historian

See also
 Charles Wilson (disambiguation)